PS Thomas Dugdale was a paddle steamer passenger vessel operated by the London and North Western Railway and the Lancashire and Yorkshire Railway from 1873 to 1883.

History

She was built by A. Leslie and Company on the River Tyne for the London and North Western Railway and the Lancashire and Yorkshire Railway for their services from Fleetwood.

She was named after one of the directors of the Lancashire and Yorkshire Railway.

In 1882 she received new engines by Rankin and Blackmore.

She collided with PS Azalea of Glasgow, in Lough Foyle, on or about 4 September 1888.

She was renamed P.S. Laurel around 1890.

References

1873 ships
Passenger ships of the United Kingdom
Steamships
Ships built on the River Tyne
Ships of the London and North Western Railway
Ships of the Lancashire and Yorkshire Railway
Paddle steamers of the United Kingdom